

Concepción is a lake in Chiquitos Province, Santa Cruz Department, Bolivia. At an elevation of 248 m, its surface area is 58 to 158 km2.

References

Lakes of Santa Cruz Department (Bolivia)
Ramsar sites in Bolivia